Dagný Skúladóttir (born 10 May 1980) is an Icelandic former team handball player. She played on the Icelandic national team, and participated at the 2011 World Women's Handball Championship in Brazil. In 2013, she was named the Úrvalsdeild kvenna Player of the Year.

National team career
Dagný played 119 games for the Icelandic national handball team, scoring 274 goals.

References

1980 births
Living people
Dagny Skuladottir
Dagny Skuladottir
21st-century Icelandic women